The following is a list of notable Sufi orders or schools (tariqa).

A

Ahmadia (Imam Shaykh Burhanuddin)
Ahmad al-Alawi

B
 Ba 'Alawiyya (Ba’ Alawi tariqa)
 Badawiyya (Badawi tariqa)
 Bektashi (Bektashiyyah tariqa)
 Burhaniyya (Burhani tariqa)

C
 Chabiyya
 Chishti Order (Chishti tariqa, Chishtiyya)
 Ishq-Nuri Tariqa
 Chishtiah Matloobiah (Tayyabah, Chishtiah, Sabriah, Qudoosiah, Imdadiah, Matloobiah)

D
 Dardouriyya

G
 Galibi Order
 Ganduzyya

H
 Hamallayya

I
 Idrisiyya
 Isawiyya (Aissawa, Issawiyya)

J
 Jahriyya
 Jilala
 Jibawiyyah

K

 Khalwati order (Halveti, Halwatiyya, Khalwatiyya) 
 Gulshani
 Jelveti
 Jerrahi
 Nur Ashki Jerrahi
 Karabashi
 Khalwatiyya Sammaniyya (see Muhammad as-Samman al-Madani)
 Nasuhi
 Rahmani
 Sunbuli
 Sha`bani
 Ussaki
 Khatmiyya
 Kubrawiyya

M
 Madariyya
 Madyaniyya
 Maizbhandaria
 Malamatiyya 
 Marufi
 Mevlevi Order (Mawlawiyyah, Mevlevi, "Whirling Dervishes")
 Mirghaniyya
 Mouride (Murid tariqa, Muridiyya, Yoonu Murit)
 Murīdūn

N
 Naqshbandi (Naqshbandiyyah, Al Siddiqiyya, Al Tayfuriyya, Mustafvi)
 Haqqaniyya
 İsmailağa
 Khalidiyya (see also Khâlid-i Baghdâdî)
 Mujadidiyyah (see Ahmad Sirhindi)
 Saifia
 Süleymancılar
 Nasiriyya
 Nimatullahi
 Noorbakshia

O
 Omariyya
 Ouazzaniyya

Q
 Qadiriyya (Qadiri, Elkadr, Kadray, Kadiri)
 Halisa – Halisiyya
 Kasnazani
 Qadiriyya Harariya
 Qadiriyya–Mukhtariyya Brotherhood
 Qadriyyah Razai
 Qadri Noshahi
 Razwi (Razwi'yah, Razwi'ya, see Ala Hazrat Imam Ahmed Raza Khan)
 Sarwari Qadiri
 Qadiriyyathun Nabaviyyah
 Qadiriyya wa Naqshbandiyya
 Qudusiyah
 Qadri Tartusi

R
 Rahmani (Rahmaniyya)
 Rifa`i (Rifa'iyya)
 Rishi order

S
 Safaviyya
 Senusiyya (Senusi tariqa)
 Shadhili (Shadhiliyyah)
 Attasiyah
 Darqawiyya (Darqawa)
 Habibiyya (see Muhammad ibn al-Habib
 Murabitun
 Darqawi Hashimiya
 Fassiyya
 Maryamiyya
 Shadhilia-Batawia
 Shattariyya
 Sheikhiyya
 Suhrawardiyya (Suhrawardi tariqa)
 Sa'diyya

T
 Taïbiyya
 Tijaniyyah (also Tijani)

U
 Uwaisi

Y
 Yasawiyyah
 Youssoufiyya

Z
 Zahediyya
 Zaïaniyya
 Zarrouqiyya (Wazifa Zarruqiyya)
 Zahabiya

Other Sufi groups
 Akbariyya
 Azeemiyya
 Bayramiye (al Bayramiyya)
Bawa Muhaiyaddeen Fellowship 
 Dasuqi (Desuqiyya)
 Fultali
 Hurufiyya
 International Association of Sufism
 Jaririya
 Jelveti (Jalwatiyya, Celvetîyye)
 Khufiyya
 Khwajagan
 Layene
 Roshani movement
 Salihiyya

Unorthodox or Pseudo-Sufi groups
 Alevi (Shia)
 Alians (Shia)
 Baba Samit (Shia)
 Bektashiyya
 Haqqani Anjuman
 Inayatiyya
 International Spiritual Movement Anjuman Serfaroshan-e-Islam
 Moorish Orthodox Church
 Moorish Science Temple of America
 Qalandariyya
 Sufi Ruhaniat International

References

Further reading
 Yves Bomati and Houchang Nahavandi,Shah Abbas, Emperor of Persia,1587–1629, 2017, ed. Ketab Corporation, Los Angeles, English translation by Azizeh Azodi.

External links
 "List of Sufi Orders". The Spiritual Life. Retrieved 27 May 2021.
 "Sufi Orders and Their Shaykhs". Sufism and Its Many Paths. Retrieved 6 June 2021.

Sufi orders